Hugh Hefner: Playboy, Activist and Rebel is a 2009 documentary film directed by Brigitte Berman about Hugh Hefner, creator of Playboy magazine. Berman previously directed the Academy Award-winning documentary Artie Shaw: Time Is All You've Got.

Selected cast
The documentary includes clips and interviews with: 
 Hugh Hefner
 Josh White
 Dizzy Gillespie
 Sammy Davis Jr
 Joan Baez
 Jim Brown
 Dick Cavett
 Pat Boone
 Susan Brownmiller
 Gene Simmons
 Jenny McCarthy
 Mike Wallace
 Dick Gregory
 Tony Curtis
 Shannon Tweed
 Jesse Jackson
 Tony Bennett
 James Caan
 David Steinberg
 George Lucas
 Ruth Westheimer (Dr. Ruth)
 Bill Maher
 Pete Seeger

Production
It was also produced by Berman, along with Peter Raymont and Victor Solnicki. Neither Hefner nor his company had any formal role in the making of the documentary, though he gave the filmmakers considerable access. The documentary filmed from 10 January 2008 to 31 August 2008 in Ontario.

Release and reception
The film opened on 30 July 2010 in Los Angeles. in only four theaters for three days grossing $10,000—$2,500 per theater.

The film received mixed reviews from critics. Review aggregator Rotten Tomatoes reports that 59% of 54 critics have given the film a positive review, with a rating average of 6.4 out of 10. Metacritic, which assigns a weighted average score out of 100 to reviews from mainstream critics, gives the film a score of 55 based on 16 reviews.

Further reading

References

External links
 
 
 
 Hugh Hefner: Playboy, Activist and Rebel at Metacritic
 

2009 films
English-language Canadian films
2009 documentary films
Canadian documentary films
Documentary films about mass media owners
Films about adult magazine publishers (people)
2000s English-language films
2000s Canadian films